Bridesmaids is a 2011 American comedy film directed by Paul Feig, written by Annie Mumolo and Kristen Wiig, who also plays the titular character, and produced by Judd Apatow, Barry Mendel, and Clayton Townsend. The plot centers on Annie, who suffers a series of misfortunes after being asked to serve as maid of honor for her best friend, Lillian, played by Maya Rudolph. Rose Byrne, Melissa McCarthy, Ellie Kemper, and Wendi McLendon-Covey co-star as Lillian's bridesmaids, with Chris O'Dowd, Rebel Wilson, Matt Lucas, Michael Hitchcock, Jon Hamm, Franklyn Ajaye, and Jill Clayburgh, in her final film appearance, in supporting roles.

Actresses Mumolo and Wiig wrote the screenplay after the latter was cast in Apatow's 2007 comedy film Knocked Up, and budgeted at $32.5 million. Upon its opening release in the United States and Canada on May 13, 2011, Bridesmaids was a critical and commercial success. The film made $26 million in its opening weekend, eventually earning over $306 million worldwide, and surpassed Knocked Up to become the top-grossing Apatow production to date, and served as a touchstone for discussion about women in comedy.

Bridesmaids was nominated for a Golden Globe Award for Best Motion Picture – Musical or Comedy. It received multiple other accolades. In 2012, the film was nominated for both the Academy Award for Best Supporting Actress for Melissa McCarthy and Best Original Screenplay for Wiig and Mumolo. This made Bridesmaids the first Apatow-produced film to be nominated for an Academy Award.

Plot

Annie Walker is a single underachieving down-on-her-luck woman in her mid-thirties living in Milwaukee. Her bakery failed due to the recession, wiping out her savings, and causing her boyfriend to leave her. Having lost her passion, she works a stressful, underpaid job at a jewelry store and shares an apartment with weird British immigrant siblings Gil and Brynn. Annie has a casual sexual relationship with the wealthy and self-absorbed Ted, who treats her like an object. The only positive presence in her life is her lifelong best friend, Lillian. When Lillian becomes engaged to her boyfriend Doug, she asks Annie to be her maid of honor.

At the engagement party, Annie meets Lillian's bridesmaids: Lillian's long married and cynical cousin Rita; Lillian's naïve newlywed coworker Becca; Doug's raunchy, foul-mouthed but friendly sister Megan; and the wealthy and snobby Helen, Doug's boss' trophy wife. Annie and Helen are instantly jealous of each other's friendship with Lillian and become increasingly competitive for her attention. However, Helen genuinely puts in the effort to be friends with Annie, despite the latter's hostility towards her.

Annie takes the bridal party to a Brazilian steak restaurant before visiting an upscale bridal shop, where Helen uses her influence to gain entry as Annie failed to make a reservation. While trying on gowns, the entire party – except Helen, who chose not to eat – begins vomiting and experiencing uncontrollable diarrhea from food poisoning, with Lillian voiding her bowels in the middle of the street while wearing a wedding dress.

Annie's suggestion for a bachelorette party at Lillian's parents' lake house is overruled in favor of a Las Vegas trip planned by Helen. Unable to afford a first-class ticket and too proud to allow Helen to pay, Annie books a ticket in economy class. Annie accepts a sedative and liquor from Helen to calm her massive fear of flying and she begins to hallucinate, ending in a paranoid outburst leading to her being apprehended by a U.S. Air Marshal. The plane makes an emergency landing and the party takes a bus back home. Annie apologizes, but Lillian decides it's best if Helen takes over planning the bridal shower and wedding.

Annie grows close with Nathan Rhodes, an Irish-American Wisconsin State Patrol officer who lets her off without a ticket for broken brake lights. Nathan, who had been a customer at Annie's bakery, repeatedly encourages her to open a new bakery. After a romantic night together, Nathan surprises her with baking supplies, but Annie is annoyed and leaves.

Annie is fired from the jewelry store for having a profanity-laden argument with a teenage customer and is then kicked out by her roommates, forcing her to move in with her mother. She then travels to Helen's home in Chicago for the extravagant bridal shower, which is Parisian-themed - an idea of Annie's that Helen had previously rejected. After Helen upstages her heartfelt gift by gifting Lillian a trip to Paris, an enraged Annie throws a tantrum and destroys the outside décor; angry that Annie has now ruined every event in her wedding, Lillian kicks her out of the shower and the wedding. Driving home, Annie's still-broken taillights result in a car accident, but the other driver flees. Nathan arrives on the scene and admonishes Annie for not fixing her taillights or taking responsibility for her life. Ted arrives to give Annie a ride, causing Nathan to storm off. When Ted suggests Annie perform oral sex on him in the car, she demands he let her get out and she walks home.

Annie becomes reclusive, but Megan arrives and motivates her to take control of her life. Annie resumes baking, gets her car fixed, and tries to make amends with Nathan, who ignores her. On the day of the wedding, Helen appears at Annie's doorstep begging for help finding Lillian, who has disappeared. Helen apologizes to Annie, revealing Lillian only hung out with her because she is good at planning weddings, and she does not have any true friends, even her husband does not spend time with her. Enlisting Nathan's help, they find Lillian at her own apartment, having become overwhelmed by Helen's extravagant wedding planning and fear of leaving her life in Milwaukee. Annie reconciles with Lillian and resumes her role as maid of honor.

After the wedding, Annie and Helen finally become friends. Annie also reconciles with Nathan, and they ride away in his police car.

Cast

 Kristen Wiig as Annie Walker
 Maya Rudolph as Lillian Donovan
 Rose Byrne as Helen Harris III
 Melissa McCarthy as Megan Price
 Wendi McLendon-Covey as Rita
 Ellie Kemper as Becca
 Chris O'Dowd as Officer Nathan Rhodes
 Jill Clayburgh as Judy Walker 
 Matt Lucas as Gil
 Rebel Wilson as Brynn
 Michael Hitchcock as Don
 Tim Heidecker as Douglas "Doug/Dougie" Price
 Ben Falcone as Air Marshall Jon
 Dana Powell as Flight Attendant Claire
 Mitch Silpa as Flight Attendant Steve
 Terry Crews as Rodney
 Jillian Bell as Girl at Shower
 Franklyn Ajaye as Lillian's father
 Matt Bennett as Helen's Stepson
 Jon Hamm as Ted

The cast features brief appearances by several actors from the television series The Office, including Jessica St. Clair, Nancy Carell, Hugh Dane and Andy Buckley.

Wilson Phillips makes a cameo where they sing their hit single "Hold On".

Major uncredited appearances include: Jon Hamm as Ted, Annie's sex buddy; Grammy Award-winning accordionist, pianist, and composer Nick Ariondo as the accordion player; and Emmy, Drama Desk and Grammy Award winner Pat Carroll as the old woman in the car.

The film's co-writers, Wiig and Annie Mumolo, appear together when Mumolo plays the credited role of Nervous Woman on Plane, while the film's director, Paul Feig, appears uncredited as one of the wedding guests.

Paul Rudd was to appear as a man who Annie goes on a blind date with, but the scene was cut from the final film.

Production

Writing

The script, originally titled Maid of Honor, was written by actress and screenwriter Annie Mumolo and Kristen Wiig. Friends for years, they met at The Groundlings, a Los Angeles-based improvisational comedy troupe where they wrote sketches with one another, in the early 2000s. The basic premise for the film originated in 2006, shortly after Wiig was cast in the supporting role of a passive-aggressive cable television executive in producer Judd Apatow's comedy film Knocked Up (2007). Recognizing her comedic talent, Apatow asked Wiig if she had any ideas for a screenplay herself – a practice which had previously led to Steve Carell's idea for The 40-Year-Old Virgin (2005) – and she and Mumolo soon came up with Bridesmaids. Over the following years, writing commenced, with Wiig working on Saturday Night Live in New York City and Mumolo grinding out the script in Los Angeles. The two would meet on weekends and conduct semi-regular table reads of drafts for Apatow to get his suggestions and notes. Filmmaker Paul Feig came across Wiig and Mumolo's script in 2007. When Feig signed on as director and the script got the greenlight for production in 2010, Feig said, “There was an edict from Hollywood where they were all going, 'Okay this is a movie starring a bunch of women. If this works, we’ll greenlight more, and if it doesn’t, we won’t...I was really sweating because if this didn’t work then I’m basically the man who killed movies for women for eternity. So, thank God it worked.”

Casting and filming
Several actresses auditioned for the role of Megan, including Rebel Wilson and Busy Philipps, the latter of whom had worked with Apatow and Feig on their comedy-drama television series Freaks and Geeks. Wilson, who improvised for Apatow and Feig for an hour during her audition, impressed them so much that she was later cast in the smaller role of Brynn. It marked her first appearance in an American production. Mindy Kaling read for the role of Lillian, eventually losing to Wiig's Saturday Night Live colleague Maya Rudolph. Rose Byrne initially also auditioned for Lillian, but later took the opportunity to read Helen. Byrne was eventually chosen as the nemesis because she wasn't a comedian as Feig feared the character would be "coming out to be too arch if we had a funny woman doing it." Greta Gerwig and Judy Greer also auditioned for unspecific roles.

Bridesmaids was budgeted at $32.5 million. Though primarily set in Milwaukee and Chicago, principal photography actually took place in Los Angeles, California. Production designer Jefferson Sage, who has worked with Apatow and Paul Feig since their Freaks and Geeks days, noted that the first fact that appealed to him about the project "was that you had these two disparate worlds: There was Annie's world in Milwaukee, and then there was Helen's world in Chicago. It immediately drew this dichotomy between the rivalry that developed between them." However, Sage acknowledged that it was a challenge to find "architecture that would give us those Midwestern worlds. Chicago is a beautiful, distinctive city architecturally, and restricted views of downtown L.A. feel like Chicago." The production decided to use the Los Angeles County Arboretum and Botanic Garden as the location for Lillian and Dougie's wedding. Additional scenes where Annie meets Officer Rhodes on the highways between Milwaukee and Chicago were filmed in Oxnard, California, which Sage described as a "broad, flat, green area away from mountains."

Reception

Critical response

Bridesmaids received positive reviews upon its release, with praise towards Wiig and Mumolo's screenplay and also McCarthy's performance. The review aggregator website Rotten Tomatoes reported that 89% of critics gave the film a positive review based on 294 reviews, with an average score of 7.50/10. The site's critical consensus states: "A marriage of genuine characters, gross out gags, and pathos, Bridesmaids is a female-driven comedy that refuses to be boxed in as Kristen Wiig emerges as a real star." Metacritic gives the film a score of 75 out of 100 based on reviews from 39 critics, indicating "generally favorable reviews". Audiences polled by CinemaScore gave the film an average grade of "B+" on an A+ to F scale.

Roger Ebert gave the film 3.5 stars of out 4, and said that Bridesmaids "seems to be a more or less deliberate attempt to cross the Chick Flick with the Raunch Comedy. It definitely proves that women are the equal of men in vulgarity, sexual frankness, lust, vulnerability, overdrinking and insecurity ... Love him or not, Judd Apatow is consistently involved with movies that connect with audiences."

Tamara Winfrey-Harris noted in Ms. that, to her "enduring surprise," despite the involvement of Apatow, and themes that had been "done and done and done", the film passed the Bechdel test of female-driven storylines.

Critic Owen Gleiberman of Entertainment Weekly pointed out the significance of Bridesmaids success as follows: "So far, the message that Hollywood seems to have taken from the incredible success of Bridesmaids is a predictably reductive one, something along the lines of: Hey, look! Raunchy comedies for women with awesome grossout scenes in the middle of them can be big box office too!! The message that Hollywood should be taking is: A comedy that's raunchy and fearless, and also brilliantly written and shrewdly honest about what's really going on in women's lives, may actually connect with the fabled non-teenage audience (remember them?)."

Many critics, like Mary Elizabeth Williams of Salon (who called Bridesmaids the "first black president of female-driven comedies") labeled the film as "a breakthrough for female-centered comedy, and feminist to boot." It was also credited with proving that "women could pull off a good fart joke as well as the next guy, and did what seemed like the impossible: leading an all-female cast to blockbuster success."

Despite the majority of praise, the film was not without its detractors. Abby Koenig of The Houston Press enjoyed Kristen Wiig's comedic talents, but disliked the frequency of "raunchy jokes" throughout the film, writing that "we need more funny females getting the spotlight. However, we also need women that can crack you up without making you watch them have diarrhea". Karina Longworth of The Village Voice criticised the inconsistency of the film's tone, stating that certain scenes have "a kind of dumb crassness that works against Bridesmaids''' often smart, highly class-conscious deconstruction of female friendship and competition. Comedy of humiliation is one thing; a fat lady shitting in a sink is another."

Box officeBridesmaids surpassed Knocked Up to become the top-grossing Judd Apatow production to date, grossing $26,247,410 on its opening weekend and settling for a strong second place behind Thor. Bridesmaids grossed $169,106,725 at the North American domestic box office and $137,335,360 in international markets, totalling $306,442,085. Universal reported that males made up 33 percent of the movie's audience and that 63 percent of the audience was over the age of 30.

Accolades

McCarthy was nominated for the 2012 Academy Award for Best Supporting Actress, BAFTA Award for Best Actress in a Supporting Role, and Screen Actors Guild Award for Outstanding Performance by a Female Actor in a Supporting Role.

Home mediaBridesmaids was released on DVD and Blu-ray Disc in theatrical (125 minutes) and unrated (130 minutes) versions on September 20, 2011. Special features include a Line-O-Rama (a feature popular among Apatow releases), deleted, extended, and alternate scenes, and a Cholodecki's jewelry store commercial. Another edition commemorating the 100th anniversary of Universal Studios was released on September 4, 2012.

Cancelled sequel
In January 2012, industry sources reported that Universal was interested in developing a sequel to Bridesmaids. When discussing the potential of a Bridesmaids 2, producer Apatow was quoted as saying, "The key is we have to come up with an idea that is as good or better than the first one."  In an interview with Vanity Fair, director Paul Feig addressed rumors of a sequel, saying "Everyone's very busy right now is one of the problems, and kind of doing their own thing, but we're very open to it."

When asked about her potential involvement, Wiig told The Hollywood Reporter'', "We aren't working on that. Annie [Mumolo] and I aren't planning a sequel. We are writing something else." Following Wiig's statement, reports surfaced that Universal was interested in proceeding without her, instead focusing on developing a story about McCarthy's character Megan. McCarthy dispelled the rumors that she would consider returning for a sequel without Wiig saying, "God, I wouldn't want to. I would never want to. I think it's a terrible idea. I don't know anything about it. But I know that nobody wants to do it unless it's great. If it is, I will show up wherever those ladies are."

References

External links

 
 
 
 
 
 Bridesmaids at The Numbers

2011 films
2010s buddy comedy films
2010s female buddy films
2011 romantic comedy films
American female buddy films
American romantic comedy films
Apatow Productions films
American buddy comedy films
2010s English-language films
Films scored by Michael Andrews
Films about weddings in the United States
Films directed by Paul Feig
Films produced by Judd Apatow
Films produced by Barry Mendel
Films produced by Clayton Townsend
Films set in Chicago
Films set in Milwaukee
Films set in Wyoming
Films shot in Chicago
Films shot in Los Angeles
Films shot in Wisconsin
Midlife crisis films
Relativity Media films
Universal Pictures films
Wilson Phillips
2010s American films